Exeter Hall was a large public meeting place on the north side of the Strand in central London, opposite where the Savoy Hotel now stands.  From 1831 until 1907 Exeter Hall was the venue for many great gatherings by promoters of human betterment, most notably the anti-slavery movement.

History
London in the 19th century was the most populous city in the world, and yet its indoor meeting places were inadequate. The largest, the Freemasons' Hall, could only fit about 1600 people, so a consortium decided that it was time to build a larger venue. Exeter Hall was erected between 1829 and 1831 to designs by John Peter Gandy, the brother of the visionary architect  Joseph Michael Gandy. The hall was built on the site of Exeter Exchange, which had been famous for its menagerie of wild animals; prior to the Exeter 'Change, as it was known, the site had been occupied since the 16th century by part of Exeter House (formerly Burghley House and Cecil House), the London residence of the Earls of Exeter.

The official opening date for Exeter Hall was 29 March 1831. The façade on The Strand featured a prominent recessed central entrance behind a screen of paired Corinthian columns set into a reserved Late Georgian front of housing over shopfronts. The smaller auditorium could hold around 1,000 people, and the main one, more than 4,000.

Exeter Hall hosted religious and philanthropic meetings, including those of the British and Foreign Bible Society (founded in 1804), the Protestant Reformation Society (founded in 1827), the Protestant Association (revived in 1835), and the Trinitarian Bible Society (founded in 1831). The Peace Society (founded in 1816) used the hall to hold their twentieth anniversary meeting on 25 May 1836. The meetings of the Anti-Slavery Society (founded in 1823) took place there, and such was the significance of these political meetings that the phrase "Exeter Hall" became a metonym for the abolitionist lobby.

Significant events there included a huge seven-hour public meeting hosted by the South Australia Company on 30 June 1834 to support the establishment of the free colony of South Australia. On 10 May 1871, "a meeting in support of the foreign missions of the Free Church of Scotland, and of the Presbyterian Church of England" was hosted in Exeter Hall. The former Lieutenant Governor of Punjab in British India, Donald Friell McLeod, presided over the meeting, which featured speakers such as Rev. H. L. Mackenzie, of the Swatow Mission in China (now transliterated Shantou).

In addition to its primary function as a meeting place, Exeter Hall was also the headquarters of the YMCA (founded in 1844), and (from 1836) a concert hall for the Sacred Harmonic Society. Hector Berlioz first conducted concerts there in 1852, and again in 1855.

Exeter Hall was sold by the YMCA to the J. Lyons & Co. group, which assumed ownership on 27 July 1907. Lyons demolished it and built the Strand Palace Hotel in its place, opening in September 1909.

A contemporary description
The following is from 1838:

References

Further reading
 Anon. Random Recollections of Exeter Hall, in 1834-1837 (James Nisbet & Co., 1838).
 Cowie, Leonard W. "Exeter Hall" History Today (June 1968), Vol. 18 Issue 6, pp 390–397; covers 1831 to 1907.
 Holmes, F. Morell. Exeter Hall and its Associations (Hodder & Stoughton, 1881).

External links
 About the history and "passing of Exeter Hall"

1831 establishments in England
1907 disestablishments in England
Cultural and educational buildings in London
Buildings and structures completed in 1831
Buildings and structures demolished in 1907
Demolished buildings and structures in London
Former buildings and structures in the City of Westminster
Infrastructure completed in 1831
YMCA buildings
Strand, London